John Fiske (September 12, 1939 – July 12, 2021) was a media scholar and cultural theorist who taught around the world. His primary areas of intellectual interest included cultural studies, critical analysis of popular culture, media semiotics, and television studies.

He was the author of eight academic books, including Power Plays, Power Works (1993), Understanding Popular Culture (1989), Reading the Popular (1989), and the influential Television Culture (1987). Fiske was also a media critic, examining how cultural meaning has been created in American society, and how debates over issues such as race have been handled in different media.

Careers 
Born in Bristol, England, Fiske was educated in Britain. He received a BA (Honors) and MA in English Literature from Cambridge University, where he studied under the renowned leftist literary and cultural critic and activist Raymond Williams, who influenced Fiske's intellectual thinking throughout his life. While at Cambridge, he was a member of the Cambridge Footlights amateur dramatic club as a peer of several of Monty Python's founding members.

After graduating from Cambridge University, he taught in the United Kingdom and throughout the world including Australia, New Zealand and the United States. Positions he held included:

 Principal Lecturer at Sheffield Polytechnic, where he designed the first undergraduate degree in Communication in the United Kingdom
 Principal Lecturer in Communication at the Polytechnic of Wales, where he supervised the first Ph.D. candidate in Communication in the United Kingdom
 Principal Lecturer in the School of Communication and Cultural Studies at Curtin University in Perth, Australia
 Professor of Communication Arts at the University of Wisconsin-Madison, from which he retired

While living in Perth, Australia, during the 1980s and early 1990s, he was the general editor of the academic journal Cultural Studies while he taught at Western Australian Institute of Technology (known as Curtin University as of 1986). He was a Professor of Communication Arts at the University of Wisconsin–Madison for 12 years. 

John Fiske retired from academia in 2000 and settled in Vermont, where he began a second career as an antiques dealer trading as Fiske & Freeman: Fine and Early Antiques. His specialty was seventeenth-century English oak furniture. He was the editor-in-chief of The New England Antiques Journal and founding publisher of the online Digital Antiques Journal. 

Fiske published several books on seventeenth-century furniture including Living with Early Oak and When Oak Was New.

Honors 
In 2000, Fiske was granted emeritus status by University of Wisconsin–Madison as a Professor of Letters and Science/Communication Arts after having taught at the University for 12 years. In May 2008, Fiske received an Honorary Doctoral Degree from the University of Antwerp.

Theory

Semiotics and television studies 
Fiske was one of the first scholars to apply semiotics to media texts following the tradition of poststructuralism, and coined the term semiotic democracy.

He is the author of works on television studies regarding popular culture and mass media. Fiske's books analyze television shows as semiotic "texts" in order to examine the different layers of meaning and sociocultural content. Fiske rejects the notion that assumes "the audience" as an uncritical mass, the theory that mass audiences consume the products that are offered to them without thought. He instead suggests "audiences" as being of various social backgrounds and identities that enable them to receive texts differently.

Fiske's 1987 textbook on television, Television Culture, introduces the subject of television studies by examining the economic and cultural issues, as well as the theory and text-based criticism, involving television. It also provides an overview of the arguments by British, American, Australian, and French scholars. It was "one of the first books about television to take seriously the feminist agenda that has been so important to the recent development of the field."

Power 
In Power Plays, Power Works (1993), Fiske argues that power "is a systematic set of operations upon people that works to ensure the maintenance of the social order…and ensure its smooth running."

Through the book, Fiske coined the term "power bloc" in reference to the social and political economic constructs around which power functions in the contemporary Western world. Rather than constituting a particular class or permanently-defined socio-political group, power blocs are unsystematic series of both strategic and tactical political alliances. These constantly-changing partnerships form whenever circumstances emerge that jeopardize the socio-political advantages of the members involved. They therefore arise and separate on an ad hoc basis (i.e., depending on the necessities of the moment), and their alliance is specific to matters of social, cultural, historic, and/or imminent relevance.

Those who fall outside of the bloc—and fall under its "authority"—can be understood as the notion of "the people." Such people may still possess power of their own, however it is a weaker powerwhat Fiske refers to as a "localizing power".

In Understanding Popular Culture (1989), Fiske maintains that culture is integral to social power:

Culture (and its meanings and pleasures) is a constant succession of social practices; it is therefore inherently political, it is centrally involved in the distribution and possible redistribution of various forms of social power.

Bibliography
 1978. Reading Television, with John Hartley. London: Methuen & Co. .
 1982. Introduction to Communication Studies, Studies in Culture and Communication. .
 1984. "Popularity and Ideology: A Structuralist Reading of Dr Who." In Interpreting Television: Current Research Perspectives, edited by W. D. Rowland Jr. and B. Watkins.
 1987. Television Culture, Studies in Communication Series. London: Methuen & Co. .
 1989. Reading the Popular. London: Unwin Hyman Ltd. .
 1989. Understanding Popular Culture. New York: Routledge. .
 1992. "British Cultural Studies and Television." In Channels of Discourse, Reassembled, edited by R. C. Allen. .
 1994. Media Matters: Everyday Culture and Political Change. Minneapolis: University of Minneapolis Press. .
 1993. Power Plays, Power Works. 
 1996. Media Matters: Race and Gender in U.S. Politics. .

Interviews and lectures 
 1990/1991. "An Interview with John Fiske." Border/Lines 20/21(Winter):4–7.
 2000. "Interview with John Fiske," with Mick O'Regan. The Media Report. Australia: ABC Radio National.
 2000. "'Surveillance and the self: Some issues for cultural studies'" (lecture), Television: Past, Present, and Future.

References

Further reading 
Glynn, Kevin, Jonathan Gray, and Pamela Wilson.  2011. “Reading Fiske and Understanding the Popular,” in John Fiske, Understanding Popular Culture, 2nd Edition (pp. xxxix-lvii). London: Routledge.
 Hancock, Black Hawk. 2016 May 25. "From Media Matters to #blacklivesmatter: Black Hawk Hancock discusses John Fiske (Part One)," edited by H. Jenkins. Confessions of an ACA-FAN.
 Jenkins, Henry. 2011. “Why Fiske Still Matters.” Pp. xii–xxxviii in Reading the Popular (2nd ed.), edited by J. Fiske. New York: Routledge.
 —— 2016. "Henry Jenkins on John Fiske." Pp. 138–52 in Exploring the Roots of Digital and Media Literacy through Personal Narrative, edited by R. Hobbs. Philadelphia: Temple University Press. 
 Henry. 2010 June 16. "John Fiske: Now and The Future." Center for Civic Media. US: Massachusetts Institute of Technology.

External links 
Academic Family Tree: John Fiske

1939 births
2021 deaths
Academics from Bristol
English emigrants to the United States
Mass media theorists
University of Wisconsin–Madison faculty
Academic journal editors
Television studies
Alumni of the University of Cambridge